Yunfei (雲飛) is a Chinese name. Notable people with the name include:

Li Yunfei (born 1979), Chinese figure skater
Liu Yunfei (born 1979), Chinese football player
Yunfei (Samurai Shodown), character in the Samurai Shodown video game series
Wang Zuo (1898–1930), Chinese bandit chieftain and protégé of Mao Zedonga, also called Wang Yunfei

Chinese given names